Frederick Chancellor (27 August 1878 – 16 June 1939) was an Australian cricketer. He played eleven first-class matches for Tasmania between 1902 and 1912.

Chancellor was well-known as a sportsman in Hobart playing for the local Lefroy Football Club and Break o' Day Cricket Club. He played as an all-rounder in cricket bowling medium pace and he played First-class cricket in matches for Tasmania primarily against Victoria and touring English test squads. He also represented Tasmania in Australian Football matches and was voted the best and fairest footballer in southern Tasmania at one time. Later in life Chancellor took up Bowls playing for the Derwent and Royal Hobart bowling clubs and he was selected to represent Tasmania in Bowls in 1934 and was a member of the Royal Hobart Club up until his passing.

In his professional career Chancellor was a member of the Chancellor wine and spirit merchant company. He died suddenly having been in good health before being found dead having died in his sleep. He had never married and had no children.

See also
 List of Tasmanian representative cricketers

References

External links
 

1878 births
1939 deaths
Australian cricketers
Tasmania cricketers
Cricketers from Hobart